Cosmic Girl may refer to:

Music
 "Cosmic Girl" (song), a 1996 single from British funk/acid jazz band Jamiroquai's album, Travelling Without Moving
 "Cosmic Girl", a 2000 single from German europop duo Modern Talking's album, Year of the Dragon
 Jooyi, former RaNia member and current solo artist under the name of "Cosmic Girl"
 Cosmic Girls, a 13-member South Korean girl group under Starship Entertainment

Other
 Cosmic Girl (aircraft), a Virgin Orbit operated Boeing 747-400 which is used for the air launch of smallsat orbital launch vehicle LauncherOne

See also
 Cosmic Baton Girl / Princess Comet, a Japanese TV drama and manga series 
 Comic Girls, a Japanese four-panel manga series